Ramona Wenzel (born 25 January 1963) is a German diver. She competed in the women's 10 metre platform event at the 1980 Summer Olympics.

References

External links
 

1963 births
Living people
German female divers
Olympic divers of East Germany
Divers at the 1980 Summer Olympics
People from Stralsund
Sportspeople from Mecklenburg-Western Pomerania
20th-century German women